Joseph R. "Jay" Cottone (born c. 1949) is a former American football coach. He served as head football coach at Plymouth State University in Plymouth, New Hampshire from 1981 to 1985, compiling a record of 46–7 and leading the Panthers to five consecutive New England Football Conference (NEFC) titles.

Cottone played college football as a quarterback at Norwich University in Northfield, Vermont from 1968 to 1970. He resigned from his position at Plymouth State University in July 1986 to become an assistant at the University of Massachusetts Amherst (UMass) under head coach Jim Reid. In 1988, Cottone was hired as the head football coach at Hall High School in West Hartford, Connecticut. He resigned in 1995 after amassing a record of 33–41–3 in eight seasons.

Head coaching record

College

References

1940s births
Year of birth missing (living people)
Living people
American football quarterbacks
Norwich Cadets football coaches
Norwich Cadets football players
Plymouth State Panthers football coaches
UMass Minutemen football coaches
High school football coaches in Connecticut